The Pacific Coast Basketball Circuit  ( or CIBACOPA) is an eight team basketball league based in Northwestern Mexico.  The matches take place from March to June.

History
A league with the same name existed in the 1980s, and the second incarnation was founded in 2001. The charter members were Caballeros de Culiacán, Delfines de Mazatlán, Frayles de Guasave, Lobos Marinos de La Paz, Paisas de Los Cabos, and Pioneros de Los Mochis. Caballeros de Culiacán won the inaugural league title by defeating Delfines de Mazatlán four games to none in the finals.

The 2019 season saw a total attendance of more than 220,000.

The league celebrated its 20th season in 2020. A new franchise, Gallos de Aguascalientes, was set to join but were expelled before the season began.

Teams

List of champions

Championships 
Teams that are no longer active are marked in italics.

Former clubs 

Águilas Doradas de Durango (2017–2018)
Calor de Mexicali (2007)
Bomberos de Mexicali (2010–2011)
Cañeros Dorados de Navolato (2002–2006)
Colorados de San Luis (2007)
Coras de Tepic (2001–2002, 2009, 2012)
Coras de Nayarit (2009–2010)
Lagartos UAN Tepic (2011)
Delfines de La Paz
Delfines de Mazatlán (2001–2003)
Tiburones de Mazatlán (2004–2007)
Lobos UAD Mazatlán (2007–2015)
Naúticos de Mazatlán (2015–2019)
Frayles de Guasave (2001–2018)
Fuerza Guinda de Nogales (2003–2016)
Gallos de Aguascalientes (2020)
Garra Cañera de Navolato (2012–2018)
Gigantes de Jalisco (2018–2022)
Halcones de Guamúchil (2001–??)
Industriales de Mexicali
Lobos Marinos de La Paz (2001, 2003–2004)
Mantarrayas de La Paz (2019–2022)
Marineros de Guaymas (2005–2006)
Bucaneros de Guaymas (2007–2008)
Mineros de Caborca (2014–2015)
Mineros de Cananea (2006–2013)
Mochomos de Guamúchil
Paisas de Cabo San Lucas (2001–2003)
Paskolas de Navojoa (2004–2008)
Pistones de Culiacán (2005)
Soles de Hermosillo (2003–2004)
Trigueros de Ciudad Obregón (2001–2013)
Vaqueros de Agua Prieta (2007–2009, 2016)

References

External links
League Profile at Eurobasket.com
CIBACOPA Seasons at http://www.latinbasket.com/Mexico/basketball-League-CIBACOPA.asp
CIBACOPA Equipos at https://cibacopa.org/equipos/

 
2001 establishments in Mexico
Sport in Baja California
Sport in Sinaloa
Sport in Sonora
Baja California Sur
Basketball leagues in Mexico